The Australia Institute is a left-wing public policy think tank based in Canberra, Australia.  Since its launch in 1994, it has carried out research on a broad range of economic, social, and environmental issues.

The institute has offices in Canberra, Hobart, and Adelaide.

Research

The Australia Institute undertakes economic analysis with special emphasis on the role of the public sector as well as issues such as taxation, inequality, including gender inequality, poverty, privatisation, foreign investment, and corporate power. Some of the Australia Institute's contributions involve analysis of modelling exercises on the part of other groups. This includes assessing some of the pandemic modelling as well as the modelling behind the government's intergenerational report. The fiscal response has prompted attention to the tax base, and so the Australia Institute described the principles of a good tax and a report on how to make the budget less sexist. These are some of the topics among the hundreds of reports on economic issues generally.  

The Australia Institute has been producing research in the climate and energy space since 1994.  In 2017, The Australia Institute took over the work of the Climate Institute, including continuing the Climate of the Nation report, the longest continuous survey of community attitudes to climate change in Australia. The Australia Institute also publishes the National Energy Emissions Audit.

The Australia Institute's Democracy & Accountability Program was established to “research the solutions to our democratic deficit and develop the political strategies to put them into practice”. Issues pursued by the program include truth in political advertising laws, how state and federal governments have handled the COVID-19 pandemic, and freedom of information laws.

In October 2019, The Australia Institute established the International and Security Affairs Program to examine "the global connectivity that both underpins and impacts on Australia’s place in the world and the well-being of our citizens”. The program addresses a broad range of contemporary global issues, including new thinking on what security means, a contemporary Middle east policy, the proper use of the defence force, the ANZUS treaty, Australia's relations with China, and how Australia might improve its performance in the Pacific.

The Australia Institute's researchers are prominent commentators on public policy issues, including work on climate change and energy, emissions trading, taxation policy, and inequality.

Centres

The Centre for Future Work 
In 2016, the Australia Institute set up the Centre for Future of Work "to conduct and publish economic research on work, employment, and labour markets". Its founding director is Canadian economist Dr Jim Stanford.

The Centre For Future Work also hosts the Carmichael Centre, which was established to honour the late Laurie Carmichael and publishes research on themes related to Carmichael's legacy, including industrial relations; social policy; manufacturing and industry policy; vocational education; and international labour solidarity.

The Nordic Policy Centre 
The Nordic Policy Centre was established in 2019 to explore the policy lessons that Australia can learn from the Nordic nations. The Nordic Policy Centre is partnering with Deakin University on the first series of research papers. Professor Andrew Scott, Deakin University, is the Convenor. The Nordic Edge Possibilities for Australia was published by the Centre in 2021, to show how Nordic nations have secured progress across a range of public policy areas.

The Centre for Responsible Technology 
The Centre for Responsible Technology was established in 2019 to examine the way network technology and digital platforms are impacting people and society.

History 
Professor Clive Hamilton helped establish The Australia Institute in 1994 to generate public debate on building a better society. "I wondered, 'Where are the progressive think tanks making debate on the environment and broader public issues?'". The first directors of the institute also included Professor Max Neutze (inaugural Chair) and Professor Hugh Saddler.

Hamilton was the Executive Director until his resignation in 2008. He was succeeded in the role by Dr Richard Denniss, who stepped down in 2015 to take up the role of Chief Economist.

Ben Oquist was Executive Director from 2015 to 2022.  He was succeeded by Dr Richard Denniss who returned to the role in 2022.

Climate change and energy

The Australia Institute is active in promoting global warming mitigation measures, and has been critical of the Australian federal government's perceived lack of action on climate change. The Australia Institute was critical of the Howard Government's decision to refuse to ratify the Kyoto Protocol. It claims that the former Prime Minister and some senior ministers deny the scientific evidence for global warming and that the resources sector drives government energy policy.  Leaked minutes of a meeting between the Energy Minister, the Prime Minister and fossil fuel lobbyists provide evidence for these claims.

The Australia Institute has been active in promoting renewable energy development, and other mitigation measures, and it has campaigned strongly against developing a nuclear industry in Australia.

The Australia Institute criticised the Rudd Government's proposed Australian emissions trading scheme (or Carbon Pollution Reduction Scheme), arguing that it failed to adequately take into account voluntary action and delivered excessive compensation to polluting industries.

The Australia Institute spoke positively of the design of the carbon price mechanism implemented by the Gillard Government, arguing that beginning with a fixed price and transitioning to an emissions trading scheme made sense given that there was no consensus about what the emissions reduction target should be.

In 2014, Ben Oquist (then the Australia Institute's strategy director) was involved in the Palmer United Party's decision to vote against the abolition of the Renewable Energy Target, the Clean Energy Finance Corporation, and the Climate Change Authority. Oquist wrote that "The Australia Institute is disappointed that the carbon price is likely to be repealed" but that "The Palmer-Gore announcement has re-set climate policy and politics. Keeping the CCA, the RET and the CEFC is much more than most expected from the PUP. We have avoided a big step backwards."

In 2017, the Australia Institute reported that Australia's greenhouse gas emissions were "rising rapidly" since the abolition of the carbon price, with economist Matt Grudnoff criticising the National Energy Guarantee proposed by the Turnbull Government, saying that it would be “likely to cause our emissions to rise even faster”.

In 2017, The Australia Institute took over The Climate Institute's intellectual property after that institute closed, and subsequently launched a Climate and Energy Program to continue the work. The first Climate of the Nation report produced by The Australia Institute was released in 2018.

Tax reform debate

The Australia Institute employs several economists who have published papers arguing for tax reform, particularly in the areas of superannuation tax concessions, negative gearing, capital gains tax and goods and services tax. During the 2016 Australian federal election, the Institute published a series of critiques of the Coalition's proposed policy of cutting the company tax rate.

The Australia Institute has also criticised the final two stages of the Turnbull Government's three-stage income tax cut plan, releasing research into how the benefits from the tax cut are distributed by income  and electorate.

Funding and Resourcing

The Australia Institute had a total gross income $7.75 Million (Australian dollars) in 2022 ($7M in 2021, and $4.46 Million in 2020) and is funded by donations from philanthropic trusts and individuals, as well as grants and commissioned research from business, unions and non-government organisations. The Australia Institute reports Full Time Equivalent staff (FTE) of 37 employees.

In its first decade through to 2003, the Australia Institute was largely funded by the Poola Foundation and the Treepot Foundation—philanthropic organisations run by the Kantor's.  Other significant funders include the McKinnon Family Foundation; David Morawetz's Social Justice Fund, a sub fund of the Australian Communities Foundation; Diana and Brian Snape AM and the Susan McKinnon Foundation.

In recent years, the Australia Institute has reported the number of donations it has received from individuals, with 2,000 individual donors in financial year 2015  and 2,700 in the financial year 2017.

The Australia Institute claims to not accept donations or commissioned work from political parties.

Directors

Dr John McKinnon (Chair), NGO director and philanthropist
Ms Alex Sloan, award-winning journalist, interviewer and facilitator
Mr Andrew Dettmer, National President of the Australian Manufacturing Workers Union
Professor Asmi Wood, Australian National University College of law.
Dr Elizabeth Cham, former CEO of Philanthropy Australia (96-06)
Dr Elizabeth Hill, Senior Lecturer, Political economy at the University of Sydney
Mr Josh Bornstein, Head of National Employment and Industrial Law at Maurice Blackburn Lawyers
Former board members include:

 Lin Hatfield Dodds, National Director, UnitingCare Australia 
 Sarah Maddison (Chair), Senior Associate Dean, School of Politics and International Relations, University of New South Wales
 Tony McMichael, Professor, National Centre for Epidemiology and Population Health, Australian National University
 Meredith Edwards, Emeritus Professor, University of Canberra 
 Sharan Burrow, President, Australian Council of Trade Unions
 Mark Wootton, Principal and Manager of Jigsaw Farms and Director of the Poola Charitable Foundation
 Hugh Saddler, Managing Director, Energy Strategies Limited
 Gerardine (Ged) Kearney, President, Australian Council of Trade Unions
 Ben Oquist, Executive Director, The Australia Institute
 Richard Denniss, Chief Economist, The Australia Institute
 Lee Thomas, Federal Secretary, Australian Nursing and Midwifery Federation
 Max Neutze, Professor, Urban Research Program, Australian National University, inaugural chair
Dr David Morawetz, Clinical/Counseling Psychologist, Founder/Director of the Social Justice Fund
Professor Barbara Pocock (Deputy Chair), Director, Centre for Work and Life, University of South Australia

References

External links
 The Australia Institute website

1994 establishments in Australia
Liberalism in Australia
Research organisations in Australia
Sustainability organizations
Think tanks based in Australia
Think tanks established in 1994